John Schoonraad (born 2 October 1952) is a life-cast and special effects artist and has created more than 2000 lifecasts.

Early work 

Schoonraad’s debut came in 1981 with Green Ice  starring Ryan O’Neil.Followed by Return of the Jedi, Indiana Jones, Gladiator, Saving Private Ryan and Troy, involving work with Russell Crowe, Tom Hanks , and Orlando Bloom among others. In 2001, he worked on the film Black Hawk Down as a prosthetics supervisor.
He also made a life cast of Kristin Scott Thomas for The English Patient and endless casts for The Clash of The Titans and Casino Royale when he supervised the cutting in half of a Boeing 727.

Later Work

Schoonraad was part of the Oscar-winning creature crew for The Wolfman with Rick Baker and Dave Elsey.The 2011 Oscar was awarded for "Best Make-up".

From working with Derek Jacobi in The King's Speech to Kate Winslet in Jude to Nicolas Cage in Kick-Ass, the creative designer of prosthetics and special effects has worked with major actors and musicians amongst other professions, successfully merging the real with the unreal so that the eye never questions what it is seeing from one moment to the next. He is currently the creative director of his own company called Lifecast Ltd based at Elstree Studios in Borehamwood.

Music World 

The music world came calling after Robbie Williams requested his help for "Rock DJ", while Grace Jones asked for her head to be cast in chocolate, courtesy of Thornton’s chocolate factory, for her tenth studio album, Hurricane. Schoonraad also transformed Darkness singer, Justin Hawkins, into a devil for the video “One Way Ticket To Hell and Back” which won the Australian MTV Video awards for Best Rock Video. His video career lead to work with Björk on her track "The Hunter" plus Paul McCartney, David Bowie and Pete Docherty.

Family 

Schoonraad has often worked with his sons Tristan and Robin on various projects. They joined his company as technicians and mold makers. Tristan has showcased his work at notable art ‘car-boot’ sales including Brick Lane, the Big Chill, Mutate Britain “One foot in the Grove”, Tate the Biscuit and the Urban Art Show in Tokyo. He had his own exhibition of Boy Soldiers in London and has worked with Art Below involved in exhibiting in Parliament Square on the Plinth of Peace. Robin has been a key figure in the molding of many of the creatures for Harry Potter and The Goblet of Fire as well as special effects in The Last Samurai.

References

External links 
 lifecast.co.uk
  at IMDb

1952 births
Living people
Special effects people
People from Harrow, London